Ri Tae-song is a North Korean former footballer. He represented North Korea on at least five occasions between 1993 and 2002.

Career statistics

International

References

Date of birth unknown
Living people
North Korean footballers
North Korea international footballers
Association football forwards
Year of birth missing (living people)